Roger Cyril Whitfield (born 29 December 1943) is a former British cyclist.

Cycling career
He competed in the 1000m time trial at the 1964 Summer Olympics. He represented England and won a bronze medal in the 1 Km time trial at the 1962 British Empire and Commonwealth Games in Perth, Western Australia.

Whitfield was twice British track champion, winning the British National Individual Sprint Championships in 1965 and 1969.

References

1943 births
Living people
British male cyclists
Olympic cyclists of Great Britain
Cyclists at the 1964 Summer Olympics
Place of birth missing (living people)
Commonwealth Games medallists in cycling
Commonwealth Games bronze medallists for England
Cyclists at the 1962 British Empire and Commonwealth Games
Medallists at the 1962 British Empire and Commonwealth Games